Meelis Lindmaa (born 14 October 1970) is a retired football (soccer) defender from Estonia, who also played as a midfielder. He retired in 2004. He played in the former Soviet Union, Estonia, Sweden and Finland.

International career
Lindmaa obtained a total number of 28 caps for the Estonia national football team during his career. He earned his first official cap on 3 June 1992, when Estonia played Slovenia in a friendly match.

References

1970 births
Living people
Estonian footballers
Estonia international footballers
Association football defenders
Association football midfielders
Estonian expatriate footballers
Expatriate footballers in Sweden
Estonian expatriate sportspeople in Sweden
Expatriate footballers in Finland
Estonian expatriate sportspeople in Finland